IntelDX4 is a clock-tripled i486 microprocessor with 16 KB level 1 cache. Intel named it DX4 (rather than DX3) as a consequence of litigation with AMD over trademarks.  The product was officially named IntelDX4, but OEMs continued using the i486 naming convention.

Intel produced IntelDX4s with two clock speed steppings: A 75-MHz version (3× 25 MHz multiplier), and a 100-MHz version (3× 33.3 MHz). Both chips were released in March 1994. A version of IntelDX4 featuring write-back cache was released in October 1994. The original write-through versions of the chip are marked with a laser-embossed “&E,” while the write-back-enabled versions are marked “&EW.”  i486 OverDrive editions of IntelDX4 had locked multipliers, and therefore can only run at 3× the external clock speed.  The 100-MHz model of the processor had an iCOMP rating of 435, while the 75-MHz processor had a rating of 319.  IntelDX4 was an OEM-only product, but the DX4 Overdrive could be purchased at a retail store.

The IntelDX4 microprocessor is mostly pin-compatible with the 80486, but requires a lower 3.3-V supply.  Normal 80486 and DX2 processors use a 5-V supply; plugging a DX4 into an unmodified socket will destroy the processor.  Motherboards lacking support for the 3.3-V CPUs can sometimes make use of them using a voltage regulator (VRM) that fits between the socket and the CPU. The DX4 OverDrive CPUs have VRMs built in.

Specifications

References

DX4

de:Intel i486#Intel DX4